Joseph Tate Bayly (5 April 1920 – 16 July 1986) was an American author and publishing executive.

Born in Germantown, Philadelphia, Pennsylvania, Bayly earned his BA at Wheaton College, Illinois, in 1940, and then entered Faith Theological Seminary to gain his BD in 1945. In 1944, Bayly married Mary Lou DeWalt, a classmate at Wheaton College. Bayly was awarded honorary doctorates from Sterling College and Gordon–Conwell Theological Seminary.

He was one of the original signers, in 1973, of the Chicago Declaration of Evangelical Social Concern. This document confessed the failure of evangelical Christianity to confront racism, materialism and injustice as well as acknowledging the fact that they have "encouraged men to prideful domination and women to irresponsible passivity".

He was initial east coast staff director for InterVarsity Christian Fellowship, editor of His magazine, and director of InterVarsity Press. 

At the time of his death, Bayly was president of David C. Cook Publishing Company of Elgin, Illinois (now located in Colorado Springs, Colorado).

He died at the Mayo Clinic in Rochester, Minnesota.

Among his published works is The Gospel Blimp, which was adapted for film in 1967 and was also made into a comic book by Spire Christian Comics.

Two of Joseph's sons, David and Timothy, are Presbyterian ministers, originally ordained in the Presbyterian Church in America but have since left the denomination, one for independency (David Bayly) and one for an association of churches adhering to the Westminster Standards called Evangel Presbytery (Tim Bayly).

Selected bibliography 

 The Gospel Blimp (1967)
 Congo Crisis (1967)
 Out of My Mind (1970) 
 The View from a Hearse (1973) 
 Winterflight (1981) 
 Psalms of My Life (2000)

External links 
 
 "Baylyblog" edited by David Bayly and Tim Bayly
  - Joe Bayly's books
  Findagrave, Joseph T. Bayly gravesite

Calvinist and Reformed writers
Lay theologians
American Calvinist and Reformed theologians
1920 births
1986 deaths
Wheaton College (Illinois) alumni
Faith Theological Seminary alumni
20th-century Calvinist and Reformed theologians
20th-century American writers